St. John's Church, also known as Bundang Church, is a Roman Catholic church located in Bundang, Seongnam, South Korea.  Founded in 1993, it was constructed as a mixture of both modern as well as gothic-style architecture.  It features a replica of Michelangelo's Pietà; one of only three in the world officially authorized by the Vatican. The church is part of the Diocese of Suwon.

The church has a unique spiral stairway (instead of stairs) that features an accompanying spiraling mural which begins with the biblical story of creation in Genesis at the base of the walkway, including the life events of Jesus, His Passion and ending with illustrations from the Acts of the Apostles. The building was one of the churches to host the Sistine Choir on its first visit to South Korea in 2017.

See also 
 Roman Catholicism in South Korea
 St. John's Church (disambiguation)

References

External links
  

Bundang
Buildings and structures in Gyeonggi Province
Tourist attractions in Gyeonggi Province
20th-century Roman Catholic church buildings in South Korea
Murals in South Korea